Charles Dukes, 1st Baron Dukeston CBE (28 October 1881 – 14 May 1948) was a British trade unionist and Labour Party politician.

Born in Stourbridge, Dukes left school at the age of eleven, taking up work as an errand boy. When his family moved to Warrington, he joined working in a forge. He subsequently had a number of casual jobs throughout north west England, including working on the Manchester Ship Canal.

In 1909 his career as a trade union official began when he was elected secretary of the Warrington branch of the National Union of Gasworkers. He was a founding member of the British Socialist Party, and was elected to the party's national executive in 1914. During the First World War he was a conscientious objector, serving some time in prison. He became a district secretary in what had become the National Union of General Workers. From 1934 to 1946, Dukes was General Secretary of the National Union of General and Municipal Workers. From 1946 to 1947 he was President of the Trades Union Congress. In 1947 he was appointed a director of the Bank of England.

Parliamentary career
At the 1923 general election, Dukes was elected as the Member of Parliament (MP) for Warrington in Lancashire, narrowly defeating the sitting Conservative MP Alec Cunningham-Reid. When the First Labour Government fell in 1924, Dukes lost his seat in the resulting 1924 general election, unseated by his predecessor Cunningham-Reid.

However, at the 1929 general election, when Cunningham-Reid abandoned Warrington and stood unsuccessfully in Southampton, Dukes was returned again to the House of Commons. When Labour split in 1931 over the handling of budgetary response to the Great Depression, Dukes was defeated in the subsequent general election, and did not stand for election to the House of Commons again.

In 1942 he was made a Commander of the Order of the British Empire and in 1946 was appointed an adviser to the Paris Peace Conference.

Charles Dukes served as the British representative on the United Nations Commission on Human Rights in 1947 and played a part in the drafting of the Universal Declaration on Human Rights.

He was ennobled in 1947 as Baron Dukeston, of Warrington in the County Palatine of Lancaster, and was an active Labour Party peer. He died the following year in a London hospital, aged 66, without an heir, and the title became extinct. He was buried in Chesham Bois, Buckinghamshire, close to his home in Amersham.

References

External links 
 

1881 births
1948 deaths
British conscientious objectors
GMB (trade union)-sponsored MPs
Labour Party (UK) MPs for English constituencies
UK MPs 1923–1924
UK MPs 1929–1931
UK MPs who were granted peerages
Commanders of the Order of the British Empire
General Secretaries of the GMB (trade union)
Presidents of the Trades Union Congress
People from Stourbridge
Labour Party (UK) hereditary peers
Barons created by George VI